Megagle is a village in the Togdheer province of Somaliland. It is located in Buuhoodle District, north by road from Buuhoodle and Sool Joogto on the Megagle Road.

The main inhabitants are Dhulbahante branch of the Darod, with the gaashaanbuur subclan of Miinanle especially well represented.

Notes

See also

References

External links
Maplandia World Gazetteer

Populated places in Togdheer